The history of the Indian state Madhya Pradesh is divided into three periods - the ancient period, the medieval period and  modern period.

During the ancient period, the region was dominated by the Nanda Empire, the Maurya Empire, and the Gupta Empire.

The medieval period saw the rise of Rajput clans including the Paramara and Chandela clans, the latter is known for constructing the temples of Khajuraho. The Malwa Sultanate also ruled during this period.

The modern period in Madhya Pradesh saw the rise of the Mughal and Maratha empires, and later, the British Empire.

The British princely states of Gwalior, Indore, and Bhopal, were a part of modern Madhya Pradesh. The British rule continued until the middle of the 20th century, when India gained independence in 1947. The state of Madhya Pradesh was formed in 1956, and Chhattisgarh was carved out from the state in 2000.

Ancient History

The Bhimbetka caves show evidence of paleolithic settlements in present-day Madhya Pradesh. Stone Age tools have also been discovered at various places along the Narmada river valley. Rock shelters with cave paintings, the earliest of which can be dated to 30,000 BCE, have also been discovered at a number of places. The settlements of humans in present-day Madhya Pradesh developed primarily in the valleys of rivers such as Narmada, Chambal, and Betwa. Chalcolithic sites of the Malwa culture have been discovered at a number of places including Eran, Kayatha, Maheshwar, Nagda, and Navdatoli.

During the early Vedic period, the Vindhya mountains formed the southern boundary of the Indo-Aryan territory.  Rigveda, the earliest extant Sanskrit text, does not mention the Narmada river. The 4th century BCE grammarian Pāṇini mentions the Avanti janapada in central India. It mentions only one territory lying to the south of Narmada: the Ashmaka. The Buddhist text Anguttara Nikaya names the sixteen mahajanapadas, of which Avanti, Chedi and Vatsa occupied parts of Madhya Pradesh. The Mahavastu mentions another kingdom called Dasharna in the eastern Malwa region. The Pali language Buddhist works mention several important cities in central India, including Ujjeni (Ujjayani), Vedisa (Vidisha) and Mahissati (Mahishmati).

According to ancient texts, Avanti was ruled successively by the Haihaya dynasty, the Vitihotra dynasty (a branch of the Haihayas) and the Pradyota dynasty. Under the Pradyotas, Avanti became a major power of the Indian subcontinent. It was later annexed by Shishunaga into the Magadha empire. The Shishunaga dynasty was overthrown by the Nandas, who were replaced by the Mauryans.

Mauryans and their successors 

The city of Ujjain arose as a major center in the second wave of Indian urbanization in the sixth century BC, and served as the chief city of the kingdom of Malwa or Avanti. Further east, the kingdom of Chedi lie in Bundelkhand. Chandragupta Maurya united northern India c. 326-27 BCE, establishing the Maurya Empire (327 to 185 BCE), which included all of modern-day Madhya Pradesh. King Ashoka's wife was said to come from Vidisha- a town north of today's Bhopal. The Maurya Empire went into decline after the death of Ashoka, and Central India was contested among the Sakas, Kushanas, and local dynasties during the 3rd to 1st centuries BCE. Ujjain emerged as the predominant commercial center of western India from the first century BCE, located on the trade routes between the Ganges plain and India's Arabian Sea ports. It was also an important Hindu and Buddhist center. The Satavahana dynasty of the northern Deccan and the Saka dynasty of the Western Satraps fought for the control of Madhya Pradesh during the 1st to 3rd centuries CE.

The south Indian king Gautamiputra Satakarni of the Satavahana dynasty inflicted a crushing defeat upon the saka rulers and conquered parts of Malwa and Gujarat in the 2nd century CE.

Northern India was conquered by the Gupta empire in the 4th and 5th centuries, which was India's "classical age". The Parivrajaka and the Uchchhakalpa dynasties ruled as feudatories of the Guptas in Madhya Pradesh. The Vakataka dynasty were the southern neighbors of the Guptas, ruling the northern Deccan plateau from the Arabian Sea to the Bay of Bengal. These empires collapsed towards the end of the 5th century.

Middle Kingdoms and Late Medieval period (c. 230 BCE – 1526 CE) 

The attacks of the Hephthalites or White Huns brought about the collapse of the Gupta empire, and India broke up into smaller states. A king Yasodharman of Malwa defeated the Huns in 528, ending their expansion. King Harsha of Thanesar reunited northern India for a few decades before his death in 647. Malwa was ruled by the South Indian Rashtrakuta Dynasty from the late 8th century to the 10th century. The Medieval period saw the rise of the Rajput clans, including the Paramaras of Malwa and the Chandelas of Bundelkhand.

Rajput clans

Paramaras 

The Paramaras ruled between the 9th and 14th centuries CE. The Paramara king Bhoja (c. 1010–1060) was a brilliant polymath and prolific writer. He is famous for his patronage of the arts, and for commissioning inscriptions found all over the region. The last known Paramara king, was defeated and killed by the forces of Alauddin Khalji of Delhi in 1305 CE.

Chandelas 

The Chandelas ruled between the 9th and the 13th centuries CE. They created the temple city of Khajuraho between c. 950 and c. 1050. The temple complex is famous for their erotic sculptures. The Khajuraho group of temples were built together but were dedicated to two religions, Hinduism and Jainism, suggesting a tradition of acceptance and respect for diverse religious views.

The Chandela power effectively ended around the beginning of the 13th century, following Chahamana and Ghurid invasions.

Northern Madhya Pradesh was conquered by the Turkic Delhi Sultanate in the 13th century. After the collapse of the Delhi Sultanate at the end of the 14th century, independent regional kingdoms reemerged, including the Tomara kingdom of Gwalior and the Sultanate of Malwa, with its capital at Mandu.

Malwa Sultanate 

The sultanate of Malwa was founded by Dilawar Khan Ghuri, the governor of Malwa for the Delhi Sultanate, who asserted his independence in 1392, but did not actually assume the ensigns of royalty till 1401. Initially Dhar was the capital of the new kingdom, but soon it was shifted to Mandu. The Malwa Sultanate was conquered by the Sultanate of Gujarat in 1531. Malwa painting originated during this period.

Early Modern period (1526–1858 CE) 

Most of Madhya Pradesh came under Mughal rule during the reign of the emperor Akbar (1556–1605). Gondwana and Mahakoshal remained under the control of Gond kings, who acknowledged Mughal supremacy but enjoyed virtual autonomy. During the Mughal period, Gwalior became a center for music, and the home of the famous Gwalior Gharana.

After the death of the Mughal emperor Aurangzeb in 1707, Mughal control began to weaken, and the Marathas began to expand from their base in central Maharashtra.

In the 18th century, the Maratha Empire began to expand and gained large amounts of territory. The Battle of Bhopal was fought in Bhopal in 1737, where the Marathas defeated the Mughal forces. Large tracts of land in Malwa were ceded to the Marathas.

The Shindes (Scindia) of Gwalior ruled most of Gird region, the Holkars of Indore ruled much of Malwa, and the Bhonsles of Nagpur dominated Mahakoshal and Gondwana as well as Vidarbha in Maharashtra. Jhansi was founded by a Maratha general. Bhopal was ruled by a Muslim dynasty descended from the Afghan General Dost Mohammed Khan. Maratha expansion was checked at the Third Battle of Panipat in 1761.

British Colonial period (1858–1947 CE) 

The British were expanding their Indian dominions from bases in Bengal, Bombay, and Madras, and the three Anglo-Maratha Wars were fought between 1775 and 1818. The Third Anglo-Maratha War left the British supreme in India. Most of Madhya Pradesh, including the large cities of Indore, Bhopal, Nagpur, Rewa, and dozens of smaller cities, became princely states of British India, and the Mahakoshal region became a British province, the Saugor and Nerbudda Territories.

In 1853 the British annexed the state of Nagpur, which included southeastern Madhya Pradesh, eastern Maharashtra and most of Chhattisgarh, which were combined with the Saugor and Nerbudda Territories to form the Central Provinces in 1861. The princely states of northern Madhya Pradesh were governed by the Central India Agency.

The British rule was marked by numerous famines. The first railway lines and airports were also built during this period.

Post-Independence (1947 CE – present) 
 state. The new states of Madhya Bharat, Vindhya Pradesh, and Bhopal were formed out of the Central India Agency.

In 1956, according to the States Reorganization Act, the states of Madhya Bharat, Vindhya Pradesh, and Bhopal were merged into Madhya Pradesh, and the Marathi-speaking southern region Vidarbha, which included Nagpur, was ceded to Bombay State. Bhopal became the new capital of the state, and Ravishankar Shukla was elected as the first Chief Minister.

In December 1984, the Bhopal disaster killed more than 3,787 people and affected more than 500,000 people. A Union Carbide India Limited pesticide plant in Bhopal leaked around 32 tons of toxic gases, including methyl isocyanate (MIC) gas which led to the worst industrial disaster to date.

In November 2000, as part of the Madhya Pradesh Reorganization Act, the southeastern portion of the state split off to form the new state of Chhattisgarh.

See also 
 List of forts in Madhya Pradesh

References

Bibliography